The Nelson Mandela Bay Metropolitan Municipality council consists of one hundred and twenty members elected by mixed-member proportional representation. Sixty councillors are elected by first-past-the-post voting in sixty wards, while the remaining sixty are chosen from party lists so that the total number of party representatives is proportional to the number of votes received.

The council was dominated by the African National Congress (ANC) since its inception in 2000 until 2016. In the most recent election on 3 August 2016, the ANC lost its majority and the Democratic Alliance (DA) became the biggest party with 57 seats. This was however 4 seats short of a majority. On 17 August 2016, the DA announced a coalition government with the African Christian Democratic Party (ACDP), the Congress of the People (COPE), and the United Democratic Movement (UDM). The UDM later withdrew, and were replaced by the Patriotic Alliance (PA).

In August 2018, DA councillor Victor Manyati abstained from supporting his party's speaker, Jonathan Lawack. Lawack was removed from his position by 60 votes to 59. The DA and its supporters then left the council, and in their absence, the UDM's candidate Mongameli Bobani was elected mayor, with 61 votes in favour and zero against. Bobani appointed a mayoral committee consisting almost entirely of ANC members. Bobani was ousted as mayor on 4 December 2019 and Thsonono Buyeye of the AIC was his interim successor. Buyeye served in the position until the election of the DA's Nqaba Bhanga in December 2020.

Results 
The following table shows the composition of the council after past elections.

December 2000 election

The following table shows the results of the 2000 election.

October 2002 floor crossing

In terms of the Eighth Amendment of the Constitution and the judgment of the Constitutional Court in United Democratic Movement v President of the Republic of South Africa and Others, in the period from 8–22 October 2002 councillors had the opportunity to cross the floor to a different political party without losing their seats.

In the Nelson Mandela Bay council, six councillors crossed from the Democratic Alliance (DA) to the New National Party (NNP), which had formerly been part of the DA. One councillor crossed from the United Democratic Movement to the DA.

By-elections from October 2002 to August 2004
The following by-elections were held to fill vacant ward seats in the period between the floor crossing periods in October 2002 and September 2004.

September 2004 floor crossing
Another floor-crossing period occurred on 1–15 September 2004. The six councillors of the NNP crossed to the African National Congress (ANC), as did four councillors from the DA. The single councillor of the African Transformation Efficiency and Affirmative Movement crossed to the Liberal Party.

By-elections from September 2004 to February 2006
The following by-elections were held to fill vacant ward seats in the period between the floor crossing periods in September 2004 and the election in March 2006.

March 2006 election

The following table shows the results of the 2006 election.

May 2011 election

The following table shows the results of the 2011 election.

August 2016 election

The following table shows the results of the 2016 election.

November 2021 election

By-elections from November 2021
The following by-elections were held to fill vacant ward seats in the period since November 2021.

References

Nelson Mandela Bay
Elections in the Eastern Cape
Nelson Mandela Bay Metropolitan Municipality